"(I Wish I Knew How It Would Feel to Be) Free/One" is a song by British musical duo Lighthouse Family, released as their first single from their third album, Whatever Gets You Through the Day (2001). The song was originally written by Billy Taylor, with lyrics by Dick Dallas. Best known for its 1967 version by Nina Simone, and as the instrumental theme (performed by the Billy Taylor Trio) to the BBC Film... TV show, this version was produced by Kevin Bacon and Jonathan Quarmby.

Released on 12 November 2001, "(I Wish I Knew How It Would Feel to Be) Free/One" was successful in the United Kingdom, where it reached number six on the UK Singles Chart in November 2001 and stayed on the chart for nine weeks. It also reached number three in Portugal, number nine in Hungary, and number 10 in Germany.

Content
"(I Wish I Knew How It Would Feel to Be) Free/One" is a cover song of Billy Taylor's "I Wish I Knew How It Would Feel to Be Free" and U2's "One".

Track listings
 UK and Australian CD single
 "(I Wish I Knew How It Would Feel to Be) Free/One" (single version) – 4:26
 "You're a Star" – 4:35
 "(I Wish I Knew How It Would Feel to Be) Free/One" (Phats 'n' Small vocal mix) – 7:34
 "(I Wish I Knew How It Would Feel to Be) Free/One" (video)

 UK cassette single
 "(I Wish I Knew How It Would Feel to Be) Free/One" (single version) – 4:26
 "It's a Beautiful Day" – 4:56
 "(I Wish I Knew How It Would Feel to Be) Free/One" (Mutiny vocal) – 7:10

 European CD single
 "(I Wish I Knew How It Would Feel to Be) Free/One" (single version) – 4:26
 "(I Wish I Knew How It Would Feel to Be) Free/One" (Phats 'n' Small vocal mix) – 7:34

Charts

Weekly charts

Year-end charts

References

2001 songs
2001 singles
Lighthouse Family songs
Music medleys
Song recordings produced by Jonathan Quarmby
Song recordings produced by Kevin Bacon (producer)